Sebastián Suárez may refer to:
Sebastián Suárez (basketball) (born 1991), Chilean basketball player
Sebastián Suárez (footballer) (born 1978), Uruguayan footballer
Sebastian Suarez (Humanitarian) (born 1996) California